The governor of Utah is the head of government of Utah and the commander-in-chief of its military forces. The governor has a duty to enforce state laws as well as the power to either approve or veto bills passed by the Utah Legislature. The governor may also convene the legislature on "extraordinary occasions".

The self-proclaimed State of Deseret, precursor to the organization of the Utah Territory, had only one governor, Brigham Young. Utah Territory had 15 territorial governors from its organization in 1850 until the formation of the state of Utah in 1896, appointed by the President of the United States. John W. Dawson had the shortest term of only three weeks and Brigham Young, the first territorial governor, had the longest term at seven years.

There have been 17 governors of the State of Utah, with the longest serving being Calvin L. Rampton, who served three terms from 1965 to 1977. Olene Walker served the shortest term, the remaining 14 months of Mike Leavitt's term upon Leavitt's resignation to become head of the Environmental Protection Agency. At the age of 36, Heber Manning Wells was the youngest person to become governor. At the age of 70, Simon Bamberger became the oldest person to be elected, while Olene Walker, at age 72, was the oldest person to succeed to the office. Currently, a term of service is set at four years, and there are no overall limits (consecutive or lifetime) to the number of terms one may be elected to serve. Elections for the office of Governor of Utah are normally held in November of the same year as the United States presidential election.

The current governor is Spencer Cox, who took office on January 4, 2021. Governor Cox was elected in November 2020.

Qualifications
Anyone who seeks to be elected Governor of Utah must meet the following qualifications:
Be at least 30 years old
Be a resident of Utah for at least five years on the day of the election
Be a United States citizen
Be a qualified elector of Utah at the time of election

Governors
The area that became Utah was part of the Mexican Cession obtained by the United States on May 19, 1848, in the Treaty of Guadalupe Hidalgo following the Mexican–American War.

State of Deseret
A constitutional convention was convened in Salt Lake City on March 8, 1849, to work on a proposal for federal recognition of a state or territory. The convention resulted in the provisional State of Deseret. Deseret claimed most of present-day Utah, Nevada and Arizona, with parts of California, Colorado, Idaho, New Mexico, Oregon, and Wyoming. Brigham Young was elected governor on March 12, 1849, and the legislature first met on July 2, 1849. The state, having never been recognized by the federal government, was formally dissolved on April 5, 1851, several months after word of the creation of Utah Territory reached Salt Lake City.

Governors of the Territory of Utah
On September 9, 1850, as part of the Compromise of 1850, Utah Territory was organized, encompassing roughly the northern half of Deseret. The news did not reach Salt Lake City until January 1851. Governors of the Utah Territory were appointed by the president of the United States, and other than Brigham Young, they were frequently considered carpetbagger patronage appointees.

The territory initially consisted of present-day Utah, most of Nevada, and portions of Colorado and Wyoming. On February 28, 1861, the creation of Colorado Territory took land from the eastern side of Utah Territory. Nevada Territory was organized from the western section of Utah Territory on March 2, 1861. Also on that date, Nebraska Territory gained area from the northeastern part of Utah Territory. Nevada Territory gained area from Utah Territory on July 14, 1862, and again on May 5, 1866, after becoming a state. Wyoming Territory was created on July 25, 1868, from Nebraska Territory, taking more area from the northeast corner, giving Utah Territory its final borders.

Governors of the State of Utah
The State of Utah was admitted to the Union on January 4, 1896.

The governor has a four-year term, commencing on the first Monday of the January after an election. The Constitution of Utah originally stated that, should the office of governor be vacant, the power be devolved upon the Secretary of State, but the office of Lieutenant Governor was created in 1976, and a 1980 constitutional amendment added it to the constitution. If the office of governor becomes vacant during the first year of the term, the lieutenant governor becomes governor until the next general election; if it becomes vacant after the first year of the term, the lieutenant governor becomes governor for the remainder of the term. The offices of governor and lieutenant governor are elected on the same ticket. The Governor of Utah was formerly limited to serving three terms, but all term limit laws were repealed by the Utah Legislature in 2003; Utah is one of the few states where gubernatorial term limits are not determined by the constitution.

Succession

See also
List of Utah state legislatures

Notes

References
General

Groesbeck, Kathryn D. & Luke, Theron H., List and Newspaper Clippings;  MSS 658; 20th Century Western & Mormon Manuscripts; L. Tom Perry Special Collections, Harold B. Lee Library, Brigham Young University.

Constitution

Specific

External links

Lists of state governors of the United States

Governors of Utah
Governors of Utah Territory